Chor Boogie (born Jason Lamar Hailey ) is an American spray paint artist based in San Francisco, California.

Biography
Chor Boogie was born Jason Lamar Hailey in Oceanside, California in 1979. He was introduced to art in general at the age of five by a teacher in grade school, after which he decided he wanted to be an artist when he grew up.  He first used spray paint at age 10, chose the name "Chore" for himself at age 11 (later dropped the "e") to describe his enjoyment of art from a professional standpoint. He did not receive formal art training, because spray paint was discouraged as art.

He later began to volunteer as the director of mural projects for Writers Block, a San Diego group that created art with high school students.  He curated shows at the San Diego Museum of Art and the city's children's museum.

In October 2010 Chor Boogie's The Eyes of the Berlin Wall sold for 500,000 euro, making history for the street art genre. The story was first published on Curbs & Stoops by artist/curator Jeffrey Peña who wrote: "The piece is important as a social monument. Chor Boogie's canon for making "The Eyes of the Berlin Wall" is comparable to the "eyes on the street" theories propagated by urbanist and writer Jane Jacobs. 'The buildings on a street equipped to handle strangers and to insure the safety of both residents and strangers, must be oriented to the street. They cannot turn their backs or blank sides on it and leave it blind,' writes Jacobs in 'The Death and Life of Great American Cities.' It is also important as a comparison of the value of art. That is, Chor's piece costed half the price of the price for the entire wall restoration in 2009, one million euro. It introduces the beautiful idea that in our social order, art is above preservation."

Chor Boogie speaks publicly about his spiritual transformation with the sacred iboga medicine and the Missoko Bwiti tradition in Gabon, Africa, the homeland of his ancestors. He studies the traditional ways of the Bwiti and applies them to contemporary Western urban culture and his creative process, beginning with his Love Visions series in 2014. Chor's first iboga inspired painting, The Love Dance is featured on the book cover to HEART MEDICINE, a true love story written by his wife, Elizabeth Bast, that details their radical healing journey.

Works and Style

Primarily an autodidact, Chor Boogie lists as influences Michelangelo, Da Vinci, Rembrandt, Klimt, Van Gogh, and Salvador Dalí, along with early spray paint mentors from the Hip hop culture PHASE 2, Vulcan, and Riff 170.

Chor Boogie paints exclusively with spray paint, in sizes ranging from miniatures (such as a 2010 range of 2-by-2-inch "boogie birds") to building-sized murals.  He refers to his colorful style and its intended spiritual and emotional impact on viewers as "color therapy" and THE ART OF MODERN HIEROGLYPHICS.

His first major commission was a rock wall he painted in his early teens for a series of motivational speeches by Anthony Robbins.  He since had public art projects commissioned in San Diego (a mural at The New Children's Museum, as well as the San Diego Museum of Contemporary Art), Beijing, China (for the 2008 Summer Olympics) and Melbourne, Australia.  He designed and worked with volunteers to paint Edgewood at the Edge of the World, a  mural in the Edgewood neighborhood of Northeast, Washington, D.C.  He has held shows in Mexico City, Brazil, and Dubai, traveled with musicians for live painting, and has painted a number of spray paint portraits of celebrities including Hugh Hefner, Jay-Z, Ol dirty bastard, and Rage Against the Machine.  His works are in several corporate collections, including Google and Zazzle,

One of his more prominent works, The Color Therapy of Perception, is a   mural commissioned by the San Francisco Arts Commission's "Arts in Storefronts" project to improve the city's blighted Tenderloin neighborhood.  While painting that work he was stabbed by thieves trying to steal his tools of communication.  Mayor Gavin Newsom visited Chor Boogie in the hospital, and helped complete the painting.

Corporate Zombies is located in New York, NY at 5 Bryant Park. The building's owners commissioned Chor Boogie to paint a mural inside the empty space on the corner of 40th Street and Avenue of the Americas, as part of the lot's rebranding as 5 Bryant Park. Equity Office Properties/Blackstone Group commissioned a mural by Chor Boogie in Times Square where he paid homage by painting portraits of the king and queen of pop Michael Jackson and Madonna.

He has resided in the San Francisco Bay Area since 2007 where he has been an active member of the street art community and has painted several notable commissioned public murals including The Eyes of San Francisco, Purgatory, and Opium Horizons.

“Internationally acclaimed virtuoso of spray-paint Chor Boogie presents his solo show: Romanticism, where imagination and emotion meet the healing power of color therapy. Having emerged, in part, from the world of ‘Aerosol Art,’ Chor profoundly expounds on the genre in style, technique, form, composition, and conceptual underpinnings, as he can no longer be simply categorized as such. Viewers often find it nearly unbelievable that his masterful works are created almost solely from spray paint.”
– NBC News

“With his innovative techniques and spiritual color philosophies, Chor Boogie is the king.”
– San Francisco Bay Guardian

“If you ever visited or live in the Bay Area, you’ve seen at least one of Chor Boogie’s striking murals. Boogie’s work ends up looking more like fine art, which is pretty impressive considering he paints solely in aerosol.”
– Juxtapoz Magazine

“Chor Boogie is taking spray painting to new heights in the art world.”
– DUB Magazine

“Take Chor Boogie’s mural ‘The Color Therapy of Perception,’ a riotously vibrant painting of a pair of eyes stretching along Market Street near downtown. It has the visual power of a kaleidoscope, and its subject matter is an evocation of the author and activist Jane Jacob's pronouncement on urban safety: ‘There must be eyes upon the street.’”
– The New York Times

“LA Art Show is the first major art fair to host a street art exhibition featuring live performances by artists Retna, Mear One, Chor Boogie, and El Mac, launching street art into the fine art mainstream.”
– LA Art Show

References

External links
chorboogie.com – official site

American muralists
American graffiti artists
People from Oceanside, California
People from Vista, California
Living people
1979 births